Lake Eupen is an artificial lake near Eupen in East Belgium, not far from High Fens. The lake is created by a dam which was built on the river Vesdre in 1938 but inaugurated only in 1950 by Prince Charles of Belgium. The area has a German-speaking population who refer to the river Vesdre as Weser, but which is distinct from the Weser river in North Germany.

References

External links
 Hiking route along the Vesdre Dam forming Lake Eupen
 

REupen
Eupen
Eupen
Eupen
Eupen